Pseudoeurycea altamontana, commonly known as the Morelos salamander or Morelos false brook salamander, is a species of salamander in the family Plethodontidae. It is endemic to central Mexico and known from its type locality, Lake Zempoala and from the west slope of Popocatépetl, in the state of Morelos, the extreme east of Mexico State, and southern Mexico City.

Description
The two specimens in the type series measured  in snout–vent length; the larger specimen (holotype) had a  tail. The head is relatively large. The fingers are nearly free from webbing. There are 12 costal folds. Living individuals have striking violet-purplish color in their head and body, with creamy markings and mottling.

Habitat and conservation
It is terrestrial species found under the bark of logs and stumps. It is threatened by habitat loss. It is found in the Lagunas de Zempoala National Park, but habitat loss is also occurring within this protected area.

References

altamontana
Endemic amphibians of Mexico
Fauna of the Trans-Mexican Volcanic Belt
Taxonomy articles created by Polbot
Amphibians described in 1939